The Princess and the Frog is a 2009 American animated musical fantasy romantic comedy film produced by Walt Disney Animation Studios and released by Walt Disney Pictures. The 49th Disney animated feature film, it is loosely based on the 2002 novel The Frog Princess by E. D. Baker, which in turn is based on the German folk tale "The Frog Prince" as collected by the Brothers Grimm. The film was directed by John Musker and Ron Clements and produced by Peter Del Vecho, from a screenplay that Musker and Clements co-wrote with Rob Edwards. The directors also co-wrote the story with the writing team of Greg Erb and Jason Oremland. 

The film stars the voices of Anika Noni Rose, Bruno Campos, Michael-Leon Wooley, Jim Cummings, Jennifer Cody, John Goodman, Keith David, Peter Bartlett, Jenifer Lewis, Oprah Winfrey, and Terrence Howard. Set in New Orleans during the 1920s, the film tells the story of a hardworking waitress named Tiana who dreams of opening her own restaurant. After kissing a prince who has been turned into a frog by an evil witch doctor, Tiana becomes a frog herself and must find a way to turn back into a human before it is too late.

The Princess and the Frog began production in July 2006, under the working title The Frog Princess. It marked Disney's brief return to traditional animation, as it was the mainstream animation studio's first traditionally animated film since Home on the Range (2004). Musker and Clements, directors of Disney's The Great Mouse Detective (1986), The Little Mermaid (1989), Aladdin (1992), Hercules (1997), and Treasure Planet (2002) returned to Disney to direct The Princess and the Frog. The studio returned to a Broadway musical-style format frequently used during the Disney Renaissance, and the film features a score and songs written, composed, and conducted by Randy Newman, well known for his musical involvement in Pixar films such as the Toy Story franchise.

The Princess and the Frog premiered at the Roy E. Disney Animation Building on the Walt Disney Studios lot in Burbank on November 15, 2009, and first opened in a limited release in New York City and Los Angeles on November 25, followed by its wide release on December 11. The film received largely positive reviews from critics, who praised the animation (particularly the revival of the hand-drawn form), characters, music, and themes; however it was criticized for its depiction of Louisiana Voodoo and the historical negationism of its depiction of the Southern United States during the Jim Crow era. It was successful at the box office, ranking first place on its opening weekend in North America, and grossing around $271 million worldwide becoming Disney’s most successful traditionally animated film since Lilo & Stitch in 2002, and the animation studio’s most successful film overall since Tarzan in 1999, ten years earlier. It received three Oscar nominations at the 82nd Academy Awards: one for Best Animated Feature and two for Best Original Song.

Plot

Set in the Roaring Twenties in New Orleans, Tiana is completely devoted to opening her own restaurant, a dream she shared with her late father, who died in World War I. She works two waitress jobs to earn money to make this dream a reality, leaving her no time for a social life. 

Meanwhile, Naveen, the spoiled and arrogant prince of Maldonia, arrives in New Orleans, where, being financially cut off from his family's fortune by his parents, he intends to marry a rich Southern belle   Charlotte La Bouff, who is known  to be Tiana's best friend. Her father, wealthy Eli "Big Daddy" La Bouff, hosts a masquerade ball in Naveen's honor, for which Charlotte hires Tiana to make beignets, offering her enough to buy a dilapidated mill to convert into her dream restaurant. Naveen and his valet, Lawrence, encounter Dr. Facilier, a voodoo witch doctor, who tricks them into a fortune reading. Then, he transforms Naveen into a frog and gives Lawrence Naveen's appearance through a voodoo talisman containing Naveen's blood. Facilier intends for the disguised Lawrence to marry Charlotte, then to kill her father with a voodoo doll so he can gain the La Bouff fortune.

At the ball, Tiana is told by the realtors, the Fenner Brothers, that she has been outbid for the mill. Despondent, Tiana wishes on the evening star for her dream to come true. She then meets Naveen in frog form who, believing her to be a princess, asks for a kiss to break Facilier's spell. Tiana reluctantly accepts after Naveen promises to finance her restaurant. However, Tiana transforms into a frog because she is not a princess. The two are chased into a bayou where they meet a trumpet-playing alligator named Louis, who dreams of playing jazz. After informing Louis they are actually humans under a voodoo spell, he tells them of Mama Odie, another voodoo practitioner who lives in the bayou and they all go in search of her.

They are guided to Mama Odie by a Cajun firefly named Ray, who is enamored with the Evening Star, believing it is a firefly named "Evangeline," as no one has the heart to tell him otherwise. During the journey, Tiana and Naveen fend off a group of hunters and begin developing feelings for each other, especially after the latter learns to be a more responsible human being. Meanwhile, the talisman disguising Lawrence as Naveen needs more of Naveen's blood or Lawrence will return to his normal appearance. Discovering Naveen has escaped, Facilier asks the voodoo spirits (his "friends on the other side") to help retrieve him, offering them the souls of the people of New Orleans in exchange, and they grant him an army of shadow demons to do his bidding. The demons discover Tiana and her group in the bayou, although they are rescued by Mama Odie.

Mama Odie tells Naveen the spell can only be broken with a princess's kiss. They realize that as Big Daddy has been crowned Mardi Gras king, Charlotte will be a princess until midnight. The group hitches a ride on a paddle steamer back to New Orleans, during which Naveen tells Ray about his love for Tiana and plans to propose marriage to her, although after talking to her, he selflessly decides against it since transforming him and Tiana into humans and financing Tiana's restaurant is contingent on him kissing and marrying Charlotte. The shadow demons find and capture Naveen and bring him to Facilier, who uses his blood to replenish the talisman. After hearing from Ray how Naveen feels about her, Tiana heads to the Mardi Gras parade to find him, only to see Lawrence, masquerading as Naveen, marrying Charlotte. Heartbroken and now believing she will forever be a frog, Tiana flees the scene.

Ray rescues the real Naveen and steals the talisman, which he gives to Tiana before Facilier mortally wounds him. Facilier offers to make Tiana's dream come true in exchange for the talisman. Realizing she would rather be with Naveen and that she would be dishonoring her father by accepting, Tiana destroys it. With Facilier's plan foiled, the voodoo spirits drag him into their world for failing to pay back his debt. After Lawrence is exposed and arrested, Tiana reveals her love to Naveen and Charlotte agrees to kiss Naveen so he and Tiana can be human, but the clock strikes midnight and the kiss fails. Ray dies shortly thereafter and during his funeral a new star appears next to Evangeline. Tiana and Naveen are married by Madam Odie, and since doing so makes Tiana a princess, both are restored to human form after their kiss. They later return to New Orleans to legally marry and open their restaurant together, with Louis playing in the band.

Voice cast
 Anika Noni Rose as Tiana, an African American 19-year-old waitress and aspiring chef / restaurateur. She is an intelligent, hardworking, and independent young woman but works so hard that she often forgets about other things in life such as love, fun, and family. Mark Henn was the supervising animator for Tiana.
 Bruno Campos as Prince Naveen, the prince of Maldonia. Naveen is a 20-year-old musician and playboy who has been cut off from his family's riches until he learns the value of responsibility. Randy Haycock served as the supervising animator of Naveen in both human and frog form.
 Michael-Leon Wooley as Louis, a friendly, yet neurotic, obese trumpet-playing alligator whose dream is to become human so he can join a jazz band. His name comes from the famous jazz artist and trumpeter, Louis Armstrong. Terence Blanchard did the trumpet playing for Louis. Eric Goldberg, the supervising animator of Louis and other miscellaneous characters, won the Annie Award for Character Animation in a Feature Production for his work on the film.
 Jim Cummings as Ray, a middle aged Cajun firefly. He and his vast family are close friends with Mama Odie, so he offers to help the frogs get to her. Ray has an unrequited love for the Evening Star, which he believes is another firefly named "Evangeline" (a reference to the 19th-century Longfellow poem). Mike Surrey was the supervising animator for Ray. Ray's name comes from the blind pianist Ray Charles.
 Jennifer Cody as Charlotte "Lottie" La Bouff, a 19-year-old wealthy Southern débutante and Tiana's best friend since childhood who dreams of marrying a prince. Though she is initially spoiled and self-centered, she has a heart of gold and cares deeply for Tiana's well-being, going as far as giving up her chance to be a princess when she sees that Prince Naveen and Tiana are truly in love. Nik Ranieri served as the supervising animator of Charlotte as an adult and child. Jennifer Cody won the Annie Award for Voice Acting in a Feature Production for her performance.
 John Goodman as Eli "Big Daddy" La Bouff, a very wealthy Southern sugar mill owner and father of Charlotte La Bouff. While he spoils Charlotte with everything she asks for, he is a loving and generous man and loves Tiana's cooking. Duncan Marjoribanks was the supervising animator for La Bouff.
 Jenifer Lewis as Mama Odie, a blind, 197-year-old voodoo priestess, who serves as the film's "Fairy Godmother figure". Andreas Deja was the supervising animator for both Mama Odie and her pet snake, Juju, and was nominated for the Annie Award for Character Animation in a Feature Production.
 Keith David as Dr. Facilier, also known as the Shadow Man, a voodoo bokor (witch doctor) who plans to rule New Orleans with help from his "friends on the other side". He is depicted in the image of Baron Samedi and/or Ghede Nibo wearing a tailcoat and top hat. Bruce W. Smith, supervising animator of Doctor Facilier, referred to the character as the "lovechild" of his Captain Hook from Peter Pan (1953). Smith was nominated for the Annie Award for Character Animation in a Feature Production for his work.
 Peter Bartlett as Lawrence, Prince Naveen's valet, whom Dr. Facilier recruits as a partner in his scheme by transforming him to look like Naveen using a blood charm. Anthony DeRosa was the supervising animator for the Lawrence character, whose design was influenced by the Mr. Smee character from Peter Pan.
 Oprah Winfrey as Eudora, Tiana's mother, who wants to see her happy and worries that Tiana focuses too much on her dream of owning a restaurant. Ruben A. Aquino animated both Eudora and her husband, James.
 Terrence Howard as James, Tiana's father, who helped instill a strong work ethic in Tiana
 Frank Welker as Stella, Charlotte's pet basset hound who talks to Tiana during the film, when she is chasing Tiana and Naveen as frogs on the table. She loves Tiana's beignets and begs Tiana when she wants one.
 Dee Bradley Baker as Juju, Mama Odie's pet snake.
 Corey Burton and Jerry Kernion as the Fenner Brothers, two real estate agents who eventually sell Tiana the sugar mill under duress after initially refusing because someone else was offering to pay for it in cash and because they believed Tiana could not manage it because of her background.
 Ritchie Montgomery, Don Hall, and Paul Briggs as Reggie, Darnell, and Two-Fingers, three bumbling frog hunters who try to catch Tiana and Naveen as frogs. Their resemblance to The Three Stooges has been noted.
 Kevin Michael Richardson and Emeril Lagasse as Ian and Marlon, two of a congregation of wild and hot-tempered alligators who try to eat Tiana and Naveen as frogs

Production

Early development
Disney had once announced that 2004's Home on the Range would be their last traditionally animated film. After the company's acquisition of Pixar in 2006, Ed Catmull and John Lasseter, the new president and chief creative officer of Disney Animation Studios, reversed this decision and reinstated hand-drawn animation at the studio. Many animators who had either been laid off or had left the studio when the traditional animation units were dissolved in 2003 were located and re-hired for the project. Lasseter also brought back directors Ron Clements and John Musker, whose earlier works include The Great Mouse Detective (1986), The Little Mermaid (1989), Aladdin (1992), Hercules (1997), and Treasure Planet (2002). The duo had left the company in 2005, but Lasseter requested their return to Disney to direct and write the film and had let them choose the style of animation (traditional or CGI) they wanted to use.

The story for the film began development by merging two projects in development at Disney and Pixar at the time, both based around "The Frog Prince" fairy tale. One of the projects was based on E. D. Baker's The Frog Princess, in which the story's heroine (Princess Emma) kisses a prince turned frog (Prince Eadric), only to become a frog herself. Artist Jorgen Klubien believes that a story he was working on at Pixar, called "The Spirit of New Orleans, a Pixar Ghost Story", served as inspiration for the movie. The Princess and the Frog returns to the musical film format used in many of the previously successful Disney animated films, with a style Musker and Clements declared, like with Aladdin and The Little Mermaid, had inspiration from Golden Age Disney features such as Cinderella (1950).

Musker and Clements thought that given so many fairy tales were set in Europe, they could do an American fairy tale. They stated that they chose New Orleans as a tribute to the history of the city, for its "magical" qualities, and because it was Lasseter's favorite city. The directors spent ten days in Louisiana before starting to write the film.

The Princess and the Frog was originally announced as The Frog Princess in July 2006, and early concepts and songs were presented to the public at The Walt Disney Company's annual shareholders' meeting in March 2007. These announcements drew criticism from African-American media outlets, due to elements of the Frog Princess story, characters, and settings considered distasteful. African-American critics disapproved of the original name for the heroine, "Maddy", due to its similarity to the derogatory term "mammy". Also protested were Maddy's original career as a chambermaid, the choice to have the Black heroine's love interest be a non-Black prince, and the use of a Black male voodoo witchdoctor as the film's villain. The Frog Princess title was also thought by critics to be a slur on French people. Also questioned was the film's setting of New Orleans, which had been heavily damaged by Hurricane Katrina in 2005, resulting in the expulsion of a large number of mostly Black residents. Critics claimed the choice of New Orleans as the setting for a Disney film with a Black heroine was an affront to the Katrina victims' plight.

In response to these early criticisms, the film's title was changed in May 2007 from The Frog Princess to The Princess and the Frog. The name "Maddy" was changed to "Tiana", and the character's occupation was altered from chambermaid to waitress. Talk show host Oprah Winfrey was hired as a technical consultant for the film, leading to her taking a voice-acting role in the film as Tiana's mother, Eudora.

Writing and themes
The head of story, Don Hall, described the plot as a fairy tale "twisted enough that it seems new and fresh", with a kingdom that is a modern city, a handsome prince that is a "knuckleheaded playboy" and a variation on the fairy godmother with Mama Odie. Co-writer Rob Edwards also said The Princess and the Frog was "a princess movie for people who don't like princess movies". As the writers thought Tiana's character motivation of simply dreaming of having her own restaurant was not appealing enough, they expanded so it was her father's as well, with the extra philosophy of "food bringing people together from all walks of life". Musker and Clements stated that while Tiana already starts as a sympathetic character, the events of the plot make her "understand things in a deeper level" and change people around her. Both protagonists would learn from each other—Naveen to take responsibilities, Tiana to enjoy life—as well as figuring from Ray's passion for Evangeline that the perfect balance is brought by having someone you love to share the experience. Tiana became the first African-American Disney Princess.

Tiana was inspired in part by famed restaurateur Leah Chase, whom Clements and Musker met on their research trip to New Orleans. Clements elaborated, "There's a woman in New Orleans named Lee (sic) Chase who was a waitress and ultimately opened a restaurant with her husband … we met with her and we talked with her and she went to kind of into her story, her philosophy about food, which is a big element of the movie."

Voice cast

On December 1, 2006, a detailed casting call was announced for the film at the Manhattan Theatre Source forum. The casting call states the film as being an American fairy tale musical set in New Orleans during the 1926 Jazz Age and provides a detailed list of the film's major characters.

In February 2007, it was reported that Dreamgirls actresses Jennifer Hudson and Anika Noni Rose were top contenders for the voice of Tiana and that Alicia Keys directly contacted Walt Disney Studios chairman Dick Cook about voicing the role. It was later reported that Tyra Banks was considered for the role as well. By April 2007, it was confirmed that Rose would be voicing Tiana. Three months later, it was reported that Keith David would be doing the voice of Doctor Facilier, the villain of the film.

Animation and design
Clements and Musker had agreed early on that the style they were aiming for was primarily that of Lady and the Tramp (1955), a film which they and John Lasseter feel represents "the pinnacle of Disney's style". "After that, everything started becoming more stylized, like Sleeping Beauty, 101 Dalmatians—which are fantastic films as well, but there's a particular style (to Lady and the Tramp) that's so classically Disney." Lady and the Tramp also heavily informed the style of the New Orleans scenes, while Disney's Bambi (1942) served as the template for the bayou scenes. Bambi was described as a stylistic reference for the painted backgrounds, as according to art director Ian Gooding "Bambi painted what it feels like to be in the forest instead of the forest" so The Princess and the Frog would in turn try capturing the essence of roaming through New Orleans.

The former trend in Disney's hand-drawn features where the characters and cinematography were influenced by a CGI-look had been abandoned. Andreas Deja, a veteran Disney animator who supervised the character of Mama Odie, says "I always thought that maybe we should distinguish ourselves to go back to what 2D is good at, which is focusing on what the line can do rather than volume, which is a CG kind of thing. So we are doing less extravagant Treasure Planet kind of treatments. You have to create a world but [we're doing it more simply]. What we're trying to do with Princess and the Frog is hook up with things that the old guys did earlier. It's not going to be graphic…". Deja also mentions that Lasseter was aiming for the Disney sculptural and dimensional look of the 1950s: "All those things that were non-graphic, which means go easy on the straight lines and have one volume flow into the other—an organic feel to the drawing." Lasseter also felt that traditional animation created more character believability. For example, with Louis the alligator, created by Eric Goldberg, Lasseter said: "It's the believability of this large character being able to move around quite like that." Choreographer Betsy Baytos was brought by the directors to lead a team of eccentric dancers that gave reference to make each character a different style of movement. The character design tried to create beautiful drawings through subtle shapes, particularly for most characters being human. For the frog versions of Tiana and Naveen, while the animators started with realistic designs, they eventually went for stylized designs "removing all that is unappealing in frogs", similar to Jiminy Cricket in Pinocchio (1940).

Toon Boom Animation's Toon Boom Harmony software was used as the main software package for the production of the film, as the Computer Animation Production System (CAPS) system that Disney developed with Pixar in the 1980s for use on their previous traditionally animated films had become outdated by 2004. The Harmony software was augmented with a number of plug-ins to provide CAPS-like effects such as shading on cheeks and smoke effects. The reinstated traditional unit's first production, a 2007 Goofy cartoon short entitled How to Hook Up Your Home Theater, was partly animated without paper by using Harmony and Wacom Cintiq pressure-sensitive tablets. The character animators found some difficulty with this approach, and decided to use traditional paper and pencil drawings, which were then scanned into the computer systems, for The Princess and the Frog.

The one exception to the new Toon Boom Harmony pipeline was the "Almost There" dream sequence, which utilized an Art Deco graphic style based on the art of Harlem Renaissance painter Aaron Douglas. Supervised by Eric Goldberg and designed by Sue Nichols, the "Almost There" sequence's character animation was done on paper without going through the clean-up animation department, and scanned directly into Photoshop. The artwork was then enhanced to affect the appearance of painted strokes and fills, and combined with backgrounds, using Adobe After Effects.

The visual effects and backgrounds for the film were created digitally using Cintiq tablet displays. Marlon West, one of Disney's veteran animation visual effects supervisors, says about the production; "Those guys had this bright idea to bring back hand-drawn animation, but everything had to be started again from the ground up. One of the first things we did was focus on producing shorts, to help us re-introduce the 2D pipeline. I worked as vfx supervisor on the Goofy short, How to Hook Up Your Home Theater. It was a real plus for the effects department, so we went paperless for The Princess and the Frog." The backgrounds were painted digitally using Adobe Photoshop, and many of the architectural elements were based upon 3D models built in Autodesk Maya. Much of the clean-up animation, digital ink-and-paint, and compositing were outsourced to third-party companies in Orlando, Florida (Premise Entertainment), Toronto, Ontario, Canada (Yowza! Animation), and Brooklin, São Paulo, Brazil (HGN Produções).

Music

Originally, Alan Menken was considered to be in charge of the soundtrack. However, Lasseter thought that since Menken scored the Disney film Enchanted (2007), the music might be too repetitive, especially the fact that some previous Renaissance Disney animated films technically had other songwriters (particularly The Lion King, Mulan, and Tarzan). Lasseter realized that Randy Newman, whom he had previously worked with, was the perfect choice for the film and replaced Menken with him, due to the fact that Newman was a jazz composer and grew up in New Orleans, making him compatible with the project´s musical setting. Newman had also written the songs for another broadway-style musical 2D animated feature, Warner Bros.' Cats Don't Dance (1997), and had written the songs for Toy Story (1995).

During Disney's 2007 shareholder meeting, Randy Newman and the Dirty Dozen Brass Band performed the film's opening number, "Down in New Orleans", with famous New Orleans singer Dr. John singing, while slides of pre-production art from the film played on a screen. Other songs in the film include "Almost There" (a solo for Tiana), "Dig a Little Deeper" (a song for Mama Odie), "When We're Human" (a song for Louis, Tiana and Naveen [as frogs]), "Friends on the Other Side" (a solo for Doctor Facilier), and "Gonna Take You There" and "Ma Belle Evangeline" (two solos for Ray). Newman composed, arranged, and conducted the music for the film, a mixture of jazz, zydeco, blues, and gospel styles performed by the voice cast members for the respective characters, while R&B singer-songwriter Ne-Yo wrote and performed the end title song, "Never Knew I Needed", an R&B love song referring to the romance between the film's two main characters, Tiana and Naveen. Supported by a music video by Melina, "Never Knew I Needed" was issued to radio outlets as a commercial single from the Princess and the Frog soundtrack.

The film's soundtrack album, The Princess and the Frog: Original Songs and Score, contains the ten original songs from the film and seven instrumental pieces. The soundtrack was released on November 23, 2009, the day before the limited release of the film in New York and Los Angeles.

Release
The film premiered in theaters with a limited run in New York and Los Angeles beginning on November 25, 2009, followed by wide release on December 11, 2009. The film was originally set for release on Christmas Day 2009, but its release date was changed due to a competing family film from Alvin and the Chipmunks: The Squeakquel, scheduled for release the same day. The Princess and the Frog received a limited re-release in AMC Theatres, lasting for one week from October 6 to October 12, 2017, as part of the Dream Big, Princess campaign.

Marketing
The Princess and the Frog was supported by a wide array of merchandise leading up to and following the film's release. Although Disney's main marketing push was not set to begin until November 2009, positive word-of-mouth promotion created demand for merchandise well in advance of the film. Princess Tiana costumes were selling out prior to Halloween 2009, and a gift set of Tiana-themed hair-care products from Carol's Daughter sold out in seven hours on the company's website. Other planned merchandise includes a cookbook for children and even a wedding gown. Princess Tiana was also featured a few months before the release in the Disney on Ice: Let's Celebrate! show. The film itself was promoted through advertisements, including one from GEICO where Naveen, as a frog, converses with the company's gecko mascot.

A live parade and show called Tiana's Showboat Jubilee! premiered on October 25, 2009, at the Magic Kingdom theme park at Walt Disney World Resort in Florida and on November 5 at Disneyland in California. In Disneyland, actors in New Orleans Square paraded to the Rivers of America and boarded the park's steamboat. From there, the cast, starring Princess Tiana, Prince Naveen, Louis the alligator, and Doctor Facilier, would sing songs from the movie, following a short story line taking place after the events of the film. The Disneyland version's actors actually partook in singing, while the Walt Disney World rendition incorporated lip-syncing.

Tiana's Showboat Jubilee! ran at both parks until January 3, 2010. At Disneyland Park, the show was replaced by a land-based event called Princess Tiana's Mardi Gras Celebration, which features Princess Tiana along with five of the original presentation's "Mardi Gras dancers" and the park's "Jambalaya Jazz Band" as they perform songs from the movie. "Tiana's Mardi Gras Celebration" officially ended on October 3, 2010. However, it returned to Disneyland from 2011–2013 as part of the "Limited Time Magic" family-fun weekends.

Tiana also appears in Disneyland Paris's New Generation Festival. Some of the characters appear frequently during World of Color, the nightly fountain and projection show presented at Disney California Adventure. Disney announced on June 4, 2009, that they would release a video game inspired by the film and it was released on November 2009 exclusively for Wii and Nintendo DS platforms. It has been officially described as an "adventure through the exciting world of New Orleans in a family-oriented video game", featuring events from the film and challenges for Princess Tiana.

Reception

Box office
On its limited day release, the film grossed $263,890 at two theaters and grossed $786,190 its opening weekend. On its opening day in wide release, the film grossed $7 million at 3,434 theaters. It went on to gross $24.2 million over the opening weekend averaging $7,050 per theater, ranking at #1 for the weekend, and making it the highest-grossing start to date for an animated movie in December, a record previously held by Beavis and Butt-Head Do America. The film went on to gross $104.4 million in the United States and Canada, and $271 million worldwide, making it a box office success, and became the fifth-highest-grossing animated film of 2009. While the film out-grossed Disney's more recent hand-drawn films such as The Emperor's New Groove, Atlantis: The Lost Empire, Treasure Planet, Brother Bear, and Home on the Range, it was less auspicious than the animated films from Walt Disney Animation Studios' 1990s heyday, despite having a similar successful start compared to The Little Mermaid. Disney animator Tom Sito compared the film's box office performance to that of The Great Mouse Detective (1986), which was a step up from the theatrical run of the 1985 box office bomb The Black Cauldron. It can be considered that the film, despite having been a moderate box office success in general, was unexpectedly overshadowed by the release of James Cameron’s Avatar a week later after its release.

Critical reception
The site's general consensus is that "The warmth of traditional Disney animation makes this occasionally lightweight fairy-tale update a lively and captivating confection for the holidays." On Metacritic, the film has a weighted average score of 73 out of 100 based on 29 critics, indicating "generally favorable reviews". Audiences polled by CinemaScore gave the film an average grade of "A" on an A+ to F scale.

Lisa Schwarzbaum of Entertainment Weekly gave the film an "A" grade and applauded the film's creative team for "uphold[ing] the great tradition of classic Disney animation". Kirk Honeycutt of The Hollywood Reporter praised Walt Disney Animation for "rediscovering its traditional hand-drawn animation" and for "a thing called story". David Germain of the Associated Press wrote that "The Princess and the Frog is not the second coming of Beauty and the Beast or The Lion King. It's just plain pleasant, an old-fashioned little charmer that's not straining to be the next glib animated compendium of pop-culture flotsam."

Justin Chang of Variety was less receptive, stating "this long-anticipated throwback to a venerable house style never comes within kissing distance of the studio's former glory". Joe Neumaier of the New York Daily News gave the film three stars out of five stars while saying "The Princess and the Frog breaks the color barrier for Disney princesses, but is a throwback to traditional animation and her story is a retread". Village Voices Scott Foundas found that "the movie as a whole never approaches the wit, cleverness, and storytelling brio of the studio's early-1990s animation renaissance (Beauty and the Beast, The Lion King) or pretty much anything by Pixar". Betsy Sharkey, formerly of the Los Angeles Times, gave the film a positive review claiming: "With The Princess and the Frog they've gotten just about everything right. The dialogue is fresh-prince clever, the themes are ageless, the rhythms are riotous and the return to a primal animation style is beautifully executed."

Chicago Sun-Times film critic Roger Ebert gave the film three out of four stars and admired Disney's step back to traditional animation, writing, "No 3-D! No glasses! No extra ticket charge! No frantic frenzies of meaningless action! And ... good gravy! A story! Characters! A plot! This is what classic animation once was like!", but stated that the film "inspires memories of Disney's Golden Age it doesn't quite live up to, as I've said, but it's spritely and high-spirited, and will allow kids to enjoy it without visually assaulting them." S. Jhoanna Robledo of Common Sense Media gave the film three out of five stars, writing, "First African-American Disney princess is a good role model". Saint Bryan of the NBC-TV Seattle praised the film and called it "The Best Disney Movie Since The Lion King".

Upon its release, the film created controversy among some Christians over its use of Louisiana Voodoo as a plot device. Christianity Todays review of the film cited its sexual undertones and use of voodoo, arguing that the scenes with Dr. Facilier and his "friends on the other side" contain many horror elements and that young children might be frightened by the film. The film's treatment of Louisiana Voodoo as a type of magic instead of a religion also drew criticism from non-Christian factions. The film also received criticism for historical negationism of the Jim Crow era in the Southern USA.

Awards and nominations
The film was nominated for the Academy Award for Best Animated Feature and twice for the Academy Award for Best Original Song, but lost to Up and Crazy Heart, respectively. It was also nominated for eight Annie Awards and, at the 37th Annie Awards Ceremony on February 6, 2010, won three.

Home media
The Princess and the Frog was released in North America on DVD and Blu-ray on March 16, 2010.

The film is available on DVD, Blu-ray, and Blu-ray combo pack editions. The combo pack includes the DVD, Digital Copy, and Blu-ray of the film. The DVD edition has sold over 4.5 million copies and has made $71.8 million in DVD sales, making it the ninth-best-selling DVD of 2010. As of 2019, the film had earned $119 million from its home media releases. The Princess and the Frog was released on 4K Blu-ray on November 5, 2019.

Impact, debates, and legacy
Following The Princess and the Frog, Disney considered releasing at least one hand-drawn animated film every two years, starting with Winnie the Pooh (2011), and continuing with a film inspired by "The Snow Queen". The medium of the latter was later switched to CGI (although it features a similar visual style to the 2010 film Tangled by blending elements of the two media) due to complex visual elements in the story. The film was ultimately titled Frozen, and was released in 2013.

The blog website /Film noted in July 2014 with the release of hand-drawn concept art for Frozen (which grossed over US$1 billion worldwide), that any future hand-drawn animated films have been "killed" for the time being due to The Princess and the Frog failing "to ignite the box office". Two months later, however, many Disney artists announced they were working on a new independent hand-drawn animated film, Hullabaloo, as part of an attempt to bring back hand-drawn animation, consisting in three short films, while others got later involved on making the Netflix animated film Klaus, released in 2019.

Looking back on the experience four years later, Catmull stated that Disney had made a "serious mistake" in the process of marketing and releasing the film. Walt Disney Studios' marketing department had warned Disney Animation that the word "princess" in the title "would lead moviegoers to think that the film was for girls only," but the animation studio's management insisted on keeping the "princess" title because they believed that the film's quality and hand-drawn animation would bring in all quadrants anyway. In Catmull's words, this belief "was our own version of a stupid pill." The marketing department turned out to be correct in their prediction that many moviegoers would and did avoid the film because they thought it was "for little girls only." This was further compounded by the fact that the film opened a week before Avatar.

Looking back on the experience seven years later, Lasseter told Variety: "I was determined to bring back [hand-drawn animation] because I felt it was such a heritage of the Disney studio, and I love the art form … I was stunned that Princess didn't do better. We dug into it and did a lot of research and focus groups. It was viewed as old-fashioned by the audience."

Despite the absence of traditional animated feature films after the release of Winnie the Pooh, Disney Animation has been using both media for the sake of experimenting with new techniques and styles. In 2019, after Lasseter left Disney due to criticism regarding his pattern of alleged misconduct, Jennifer Lee (the succeeding CCO of Walt Disney Animation Studios), producer Peter Del Vecho and director Chris Buck confirmed that making another 2D animated film is still possible, and that the different styles are driven by the filmmakers who chose what method to use to tell their stories.

Since the film's original release, it has had success on streaming platforms and with merchandise sales.

Upcoming theme park ride

In June 2020, Disney announced that the Splash Mountain theme park attraction, which is themed to Disney's 1946 film Song of the South, would be rethemed to The Princess and the Frog in Disneyland and Magic Kingdom, which was stated to have had been in development since 2019. The announcement came amid the ongoing George Floyd protests and online petitions to change the theme of Splash Mountain. The New York Times reported that Disney executives had privately discussed removing the attraction's Song of the South theme for at least five years, before putting into development the Princess and the Frog theme.

The attraction's story line will take place after the events of the film, with Tiana hosting a party for the people of New Orleans during Carnival season. Tiana discovers that the celebration is missing a key ingredient and needs the guests' help to find it as they join her and Louis on a trip to the bayou. In June 2022, Anika Noni Rose mentioned during an interview on Live with Kelly and Ryan that she has been involved with discussions with Disney on what they want the attraction to be like. In July 2022 during the ESSENCE festival in New Orleans, Disney announced that the attraction will be called Tiana's Bayou Adventure and that it will open in both parks in late 2024. At the D23 Expo in September 2022, it was confirmed that Rose, Bruno Campos, Michael-Leon Wooley, and Jenifer Lewis would be reprising their roles for the ride. The Magic Kingdom version of Splash Mountain closed in January 2023.

Upcoming television series
In December 2020, Disney announced a television spin-off titled Tiana would be released on Disney+ in 2023. It was also announced that Anika Noni Rose, who voiced Tiana would be reprising her role in the series. On November 12, 2021, Stella Meghie was announced as writer and director, making her the first African-American director to helm a Walt Disney Animation Studios project. Walt Disney Animation Studios chief creative officer Jennifer Lee contacted Meghie for the project following the latter's attempt to pitch a live-action remake of The Princess and the Frog. The series will center on Princess Tiana as she explores her city of New Orleans.

A first look of Tiana was revealed in 2021, with the series originally scheduled to release in 2022. The release date was later changed to 2023 and eventually 2024.

The series will be among the first spin-offs of a Walt Disney Animation Studios film to be produced by the studio itself rather than Disney Television Animation. Animation services will be provided by Walt Disney Animation Studios' Vancouver studio, with storyboarding and pre-production handled at the Burbank studio.

In other media
 Tiana made a guest appearance on Sofia the First in the second-season episode "Winter's Gift".
 Tiana, Prince Naveen, Eudora, and Dr. Facilier appear in the seventh season of Once Upon a Time. Maldonia also appears as a realm in New Fairy Tale Land.
 Tiana is featured in the 2018 film Ralph Breaks the Internet, alongside all the other Disney Princesses. However, earlier promo images and trailers from the film showed that her appearance was depicted with a lighter skin tone, a narrower nose, and European features. This led to several backlashes from the viewers on social media as these drew her appearance away from that expected of African-Americans. Disney contacted Anika Noni Rose and the advocacy group Color of Change to redesign Tiana for Ralph Breaks the Internet to make sure that she more closely resembles her actual appearance, which was revealed in the second trailer.
 Tiana, Prince Naveen, Louis, Mama Odie (along with Juju), Eudora, Charlotte La Bouff, and Dr. Facilier appear as characters to unlock for a limited time in the world builder video game Disney Magic Kingdoms, along with some attractions based on locations in the film. In the game, the characters are involved in new storylines that serve as a continuation of the events of the film.
 Dr. Facilier appears in the Disney Channel original film Descendants 3, played by Jamal Sims. In the film, he is the father of a teen girl named Celia.

See also

 List of animated feature-length films
 List of traditional animated feature films
 List of Disney theatrical animated features
 List of Disney animated films based on fairy tales

References

Bibliography

External links

 
 
 
 
 
 

 
2009 films
2000s American animated films
2000s children's animated films
2000s fantasy adventure films
2000s musical comedy-drama films
2009 animated films
2009 romantic comedy-drama films
2000s English-language films
African-American animated films
African-American musical films
American children's animated adventure films
American children's animated comedy films
American children's animated fantasy films
American children's animated musical films
American fantasy adventure films
American fantasy comedy films
American musical fantasy films
Animated films about frogs
Animated films based on novels
Animated romance films
American animated feature films
Annie Award winners
Cooking films
Demons in film
Disney controversies
Films about shapeshifting
Films about Voodoo
Films about princesses
Films about curses
Films about wish fulfillment
Films based on American novels
Films based on Grimms' Fairy Tales
Films based on multiple works
Films directed by Ron Clements
Films directed by John Musker
Films produced by Peter Del Vecho
Films scored by Randy Newman
Films set in 1912
Films set in 1926
Films set in the 1910s
Films set in the 1920s
Films set in the Roaring Twenties
Films set in New Orleans
Films with screenplays by John Musker
Films with screenplays by Ron Clements
Fiction about Louisiana Voodoo
Jazz films
Mardi Gras in New Orleans
Southern Gothic films
Walt Disney Animation Studios films
Walt Disney Pictures animated films
Disney Princess films
The Frog Prince
Films about witch doctors
Religious controversies in film
Political controversies in film
Obscenity controversies in film